This is a List of Beam Approach beacon system Units of the Royal Air Force.

The first system to guide RAF aircraft safely down onto a runway was called the Standard Blind Approach (SBA) system and was trialled in the late 1930s. It was also being used by a few civil airports. By late 1941 the word 'Blind' was changed to 'Beam' as it was felt that blind did not give a reassuring feel to a system used when visibility was very low. The word Standard came from Standard Radio, the name of the company that made the equipment under license from the German company that designed it. However the equipment was also 'standard' fit on RAF aircraft. The change from Blind to Beam is evidenced in the two sets of Unit names in the tables below. There were no physical beams in the system at all, rather it relied on a heavily distorted dipole radiation pattern using a single transmitter. Instead of 'beams' it used a single heavily distorted toroid that was flipped left and right with a periodicity that simulated a morse code letter, the plane of equal field strength in this arrangement being mathematically equal to a line of zero width - a perfect 'beam' from an imperfect, cheaper, and simple radio transmitter. SBA was not automatic, the pilot flew the aircraft at all times.

The Beam Approach Beacon System (BABS) is an automatic radar landing system developed in the early 1940s but not used until much later when it replaced the SBA system.

Blind Approach Training flights

Beam Approach Training flights

Radio Aids Training flights

Other units

See also

Royal Air Force

List of Royal Air Force aircraft squadrons
List of Royal Air Force aircraft independent flights
List of conversion units of the Royal Air Force
List of Royal Air Force Glider units
List of Royal Air Force Operational Training Units
List of Royal Air Force schools
List of Royal Air Force units & establishments
List of RAF squadron codes
List of RAF Regiment units
List of Battle of Britain squadrons
List of wings of the Royal Air Force
Royal Air Force roundels

Army Air Corps

List of Army Air Corps aircraft units

Fleet Air Arm

List of Fleet Air Arm aircraft squadrons
List of Fleet Air Arm groups
List of aircraft units of the Royal Navy
List of aircraft wings of the Royal Navy

Others

List of Air Training Corps squadrons
University Air Squadron
Air Experience Flight
Volunteer Gliding Squadron
United Kingdom military aircraft serial numbers
United Kingdom aircraft test serials
British military aircraft designation systems

References

Citations

Bibliography

Training units and formations of the Royal Air Force